Wang Jiasheng (born 23 December 1943) is a former Chinese table tennis player and coach. He was a member of the Chinese team that won the men's team gold medal at the 1963 World Table Tennis Championships in Prague.

Biography
Wang was born in Bijie, Guizhou Province, and became a table tennis player in 1958. A year later, he was chosen into the Chinese national team. At the 1963 World Table Tennis Championships in Prague, 19-year-old Wang Jiasheng was a member of the Chinese team (along with Zhuang Zedong, Li Furong, Xu Yinsheng, and Zhang Xielin) that defeated Japan to win the men's team championship, for the second time in Chinese history. Wang also won the bronze medal three times in men's doubles of the 1961, 1963, and 1965 world championships, with partners Zhou Lansun and Li Furong.

After retiring from his playing career, Wang worked at two factories in Guiyang, before returning to the national team as a coach in June 1972. In 1975, he returned to Guizhou and served as deputy director of the Guizhou provincial sports committee. He retired in 2007. He was a torch-bearer during the torch relay of the 2008 Beijing Olympics.

See also
 List of table tennis players
 List of World Table Tennis Championships medalists

References

1943 births
Living people
Chinese male table tennis players
People from Bijie
Table tennis players from Guizhou